Sebastian Stewart (born 2 July 1995) is a Scottish cricketer. He made his first-class debut on 2 April 2017 for Durham MCCU against Essex as part of the Marylebone Cricket Club University fixtures.

Sebastian Stewart graduated in Biomedical Sciences from Durham University.

References

External links
 

1995 births
Living people
English cricketers
Durham MCCU cricketers
Place of birth missing (living people)
Alumni of Collingwood College, Durham